{{Infobox person
| name        = Max Pearson
| image       =  
| caption     =
| birth_name   = 
| birth_date  = 
| birth_place = 
| death_date  =
| death_place =
| education   = 
| occupation  = Journalist, broadcaster
| alias       =
| status      = 
| title       =
| family      =
| spouse      = 
| children    = 
| relatives   =
| credits     = The World TodayNewshour
| URL         =
}}

Max Pearson (born 1959) is a BBC journalist and news presenter with the BBC World Service, best known as one of the presenters of The World Today and Newshour.

Career

After completing post-graduate training in broadcast journalism, Pearson worked for the BBC in domestic radio. Since the 1980s, he worked as a frontline news presenter with the BBC World Service. Since 2014, Pearson has also presented The History Hour, a weekly omnibus edition of the BBC World Service's daily history series Witness.''

Personal life

Pearson is married with two children, and is an alumnus of Keele University. He was raised partly in Zambia. In March 2011, he suffered a cardiac arrest during a 14-hour flight from Singapore to Heathrow, London. The cabin crew allegedly refused to have the aircraft diverted when Pearson became ill shortly after it took off.

Awards
 Sony Radio Award for news (1997)

References

External links
 BBC profile  (including a video).
 

1959 births
Living people
BBC newsreaders and journalists
BBC World Service presenters
Place of birth missing (living people)